

EP 2 Odd Year & The Reverb Junkie is the second collaborative project by musical duo Odd Year (David Gonzalez) and The Reverb Junkie (Michelle Chamuel). The EP was released on April 15, 2014, under the two artists' producer monikers. The fourth track "Might Not Happen" was previously released as a single on January 23, 2012.

Track listing

Personnel 

Credits adapted from Bandcamp music store. 

 The Reverb Junkie (Michelle Chamuel) – production, lyrics, vocals
 Odd Year (David Gonzalez) – production, mixing
 Devin Kerr – mastering
 Ena Bacanovic (Ruby Soho) – album art

References

2014 EPs
Michelle Chamuel EPs